Ju-jitsu at the 2018 Asian Games was held at the Jakarta Convention Center Assembly Hall, Jakarta, Indonesia, from 24 to 26 August 2018.

Schedule

Medalists

Men's ne-waza

Women's ne-waza

Medal table

Participating nations
A total of 196 athletes from 28 nations competed in ju-jitsu at the 2018 Asian Games:

References

External links
Ju-jitsu at the 2018 Asian Games
2018 Asian Games on JJAU website
Official Result Book – Ju-jitsu

 
2018 Asian Games events
2018